Thomas Barratt (1895–1917) was an English recipient of the Victoria Cross.

Thomas Barratt may also refer to:
Thomas Ball Barratt (1862–1940), Norwegian pastor
Thomas J. Barratt (1841–1914), chairman of the soap manufacturer A&F Pears and pioneer of brand marketing

See also
Thomas Barrett (disambiguation)
Thomas Barritt (1743–1820), British antiquary
Thomas Baret